Rezgiai (formerly) is a village in Kėdainiai district municipality, in Kaunas County, in central Lithuania. According to the 2011 census, the village was uninhabited. There is a cemetery with a monument to the January Uprising resurgents. Also a lime tree alley of the former manor is still here.

History
At the end of the 19th century there were three Rezgiai estates by the Šušvė. There was a wooden chapel of St. Eustatius (built in 1759), distillery and water mill. Later there were two estates, one of them belonged to the Jelenskiai, another to the Višnevskiai.

Demography

References

Villages in Kaunas County
Kėdainiai District Municipality